"Poor Unfortunate Souls" is a song from the Walt Disney Pictures animated film The Little Mermaid. Written by Howard Ashman and Alan Menken and performed by Pat Carroll, "Poor Unfortunate Souls" is sung to Princess Ariel by Ursula the Sea Witch (the first film's villainess). In a style that combines Broadway theatre with Burlesque, Ursula uses the song to seduce Ariel into trading her voice for the chance to temporarily become human.

Howard Ashman recorded a version of the song with himself in the role of Ursula, to send to Carroll to convince her to take the role, which it did. This version was released in the four-CD set The Music Behind the Magic. Carroll admits that she borrowed some of the inflections she used in the song from Ashman's performance, and that he had been delighted she had done so.

"Poor Unfortunate Souls" is also noteworthy for Ursula's incantation at the end of the song actually being sung, rather than merely recited.  Accompanied by Gothic organ music, the spell features words somewhat twisted from normal everyday words, only strung together extremely quickly:
Beluga, Sevruga
Come winds of the Caspian Sea
Larynxes, glossitis
Et Max Laryngitis
La voce to me

Carroll's original rendition of "Poor Unfortunate Souls" was included on a 1995 compilation CD of songs performed by or about various Disney villains called Rascal Songs. The CD was released as part of a three-disc Disney song series as a McDonald's promotional item.

Reprise(s)
No less than four versions of a reprise have been written and produced for Ursula to sing in various incarnations of the Disney story.

A short reprise of this song is featured later in the original Disney movie being sung by Vanessa (Jodi Benson). This reprise is sometimes referred to as "Vanessa's Song". It was included in The Legacy Collection: The Little Mermaid, released as a two-disc album on November 24, 2014, to coincide with the film's twenty-fifth anniversary.

Two versions of a full reprise of "Poor Unfortunate Souls" were written for the Broadway adaptation. The first version, used for the demo workshop and performed by Emily Skinner, contains lyrics implying that it is meant to be sung before Ursula transforms herself into Vanessa, with the spell incantation:
Mascara, tiara
Yea, winds of the tropics appear
Catharsis, 
Et qua manicurus 
mutato me here!

The above demo reprise was scrapped when Ursula's temporary transformation into Vanessa was removed from the storyline of the Broadway show. It was replaced with a different reprise, sung by Ursula to King Triton to force him into taking Ariel's place in the agreement.

A completely new reprise was featured in the Little Mermaid Live! show produced in November of 2019 by Queen Latifah.

Jonas Brothers cover and other versions

The Jonas Brothers covered "Poor Unfortunate Souls" for the Little Mermaid two-disk special edition of the soundtrack, released on October 3, 2006 to correspond with the two-disk The Little Mermaid Platinum Edition DVD. The Special Edition Soundtrack includes a music video for the song, where the boys are singing around a public swimming pool.

Although the song mostly stays true to the lyrics of the original, certain lines have been changed to prevent any reference to magic or gender.  For instance, the line "They weren't kidding when they called me, well, a witch" was changed to "They weren't kidding when they called me kinda strange", as well as the line "I'm a very busy woman" changed to "I'm a very busy person."  Where the original line was "Flotsam, Jetsam, now I´ve got her, boys", the cover features the line "Nick and Kevin, now I´ve got her, boys". The second verse and ending have also been omitted.  Instead, the song ends with a reprise of the chorus following the first verse.

The song is also featured on Disney's On the Record along with "Part of Your World", "Under the Sea" and "Kiss the Girl" of songs from The Little Mermaid.

A portion of the song is performed twice in the Walt Disney World Magic Kingdom Halloween-themed fireworks show HalloWishes during Mickey's Not-So-Scary Halloween Party and in Disneyland's similarly-themed Halloween Screams during Mickey's Halloween Party. Also at Walt Disney World, an instrumental snippet of the song is featured in the Electrical Water Pageant to accompany the appearance of a red octopus.

It was performed at Miss America 2016 by Miss Rhode Island Alexandra Curtis.

A cover by the gothic electronic band Pretty Addicted was released on February 14, 2016.

American singer Michelle Visage performed a parody version of the song, entitled "Poor Unfortunate Queens", during RuPaul's Drag Race Battle of the Seasons Tour.

A pop rendition of the song is sung by the American actress and singer China Anne McClain, in the Disney Channel Original Movie, Descendants 2.

Certifications

References

External links
  (on Disney's official channel)

1989 songs
2006 singles
Jonas Brothers songs
Songs from musicals
Deal with the Devil
Songs from The Little Mermaid (franchise)
Songs with music by Alan Menken
Disney Renaissance songs
Songs with lyrics by Howard Ashman
Songs about witches
Song recordings produced by Alan Menken
Song recordings produced by Howard Ashman